The Japan men's national lacrosse team is governed by the Japanese Lacrosse Association. The team's best performance in the World Lacrosse Championship was in the 2010 World Lacrosse Championship, when it came in fourth.  The team came in eighth in the 2014 World Lacrosse Championship.

References

Japan men's
Lacrosse
National lacrosse teams